Northern Ireland competed in the 2014 Commonwealth Games in Glasgow, Scotland from July 23 to August 3, 2014.

Medalists

Athletics

Men

Track & road events

Field Events

Combined events – Decathlon

Women

Track & road events

Field events

Badminton

Individual

Doubles

Mixed team

Pool F

Boxing

Northern Ireland has qualified boxers for the following events.

Men

Women

Cycling

Mountain biking

Road

Women

Track
Points race

Scratch race

Sprint

Time trial

Gymnastics

Men
Luke Carson

Women

Individual all around final

Judo

Men

Women

Netball

The Northern Ireland national netball team made their debut at the Commonwealth Games in 2014. They eventually finished seventh after defeating Wales by 58–36 in a classification match.

Squad
Niamh Cooper
Michelle Drayne
Gemma Gibney
Noleen Lennon
Nordia Masters
Lisa McCaffrey
Oonagh McCullough
Caroline O'Hanlon
Lisa Somerville
Fionnuala Toner
Máire Toner
Hannah Willis

Pool A

Seventh place match

Shooting

Men
Pistol/Small bore

Shotgun

Full bore

Women
Pistol/Small bore

Shotgun

Swimming

Men

Women

 Danielle Hill finished in equal 16th position in the heats alongside Kenya's Talisa Lanoe. A swim-off was held between the two competitors which Hill won and was awarded with the 16th and last qualification place in to the semifinal.

Squash

 Madeline Perry
 Michael Craig

Table Tennis

Team Northern Ireland consisted of 7 table tennis players.

Men's Team
 Ashley Robinson
 Paul McCreery
 Peter Graham

Women's Team
 Amanda Mogey
 Ashley Givan
 Emma Ludlow
 Hannah Lynch-Dawson

Triathlon

Mixed Relay

Wrestling

Men's freestyle

References

Nations at the 2014 Commonwealth Games
Northern Ireland at the Commonwealth Games
2014 in Northern Ireland sport